Gaiking: Legend of Daikū-Maryū (Japanese: ガイキング LEGEND OF DAIKU-MARYU Hepburn: Gaikingu Rejendo Obu Daikū Maryū?, lit. Gaiking: Legend of the Divine Demon-Dragon) is a Super Robot mecha anime series produced by Toei Animation. It was a re-imagining of the original series created by Go Nagai and was aired in TV Asahi from November 12, 2005, to September 24, 2006, lasting a total of 39 episodes.

Episodes

References 

Gaiking: Legend of Daiku-Maryu